Thermo Electron Corporation (NYSE: TMO) (incorporated 1956) was a major provider of analytical instruments and services for a variety of domains. It was founded in 1956 by George N. Hatsopoulos, an MIT PhD in mechanical engineering. Initial funding was provided by Peter M. Nomikos, a Harvard Business School graduate.

After graduating from Northeastern University in 1959 John Hatsopoulos (brother of George) later joined the company as Financial Controller. Arvin Smith joined the company in 1970, and was President from January 1998.

On May 14, 2006, Thermo and Fisher Scientific announced that they would merge in a tax-free, stock-for-stock exchange. The merged company became Thermo Fisher Scientific.  On November 9, 2006, the companies announced that the merger had been completed.  However, the Federal Trade Commission ruled that this acquisition was anticompetitive with regard to centrifugal evaporators, requiring Fisher to divest Genevac. In April 2007, Genevac was sold to Riverlake Partners LLC and the merger closed with FTC approval.

In 2011, the aggregated company Thermo Fisher Scientific had revenues of over $11 billion, and employed 37,000 people.

Products 
 Zetatron, a high-voltage neutron generating vacuum tube

References

External links 
 www.thermoelectron.com (25 June 2006 snapshot from Internet Archive)

Defunct technology companies of the United States
Electronics companies of the United States
Research support companies
Defunct manufacturing companies based in Massachusetts
Electronics companies established in 1956
Technology companies established in 1956
Technology companies disestablished in 2006
1959 establishments in Massachusetts
2006 disestablishments in Massachusetts
2006 mergers and acquisitions